Haplochromis xenostoma is a species of cichlid endemic to Lake Victoria, though it may be extinct. This species reaches a length of  SL.

References

xenostoma
Fish described in 1922
Taxonomy articles created by Polbot